Nikolai Fedorovich Lebedev, known as Nekoglai (Russian: Николáй Фёдорович Лéбедев; born November 14, 2000, Chișinău) is a Moldovan-born Russian tiktoker, streamer, video blogger, and hip-hop artist.

On January 10, 2022, Nekoglai, together with streamer and tiktoker Ivan Zolo, set a record for viewers on a live broadcast in the Russian-speaking Twitch community, the broadcast was watched by 578 thousand people. However, Twitch users do not recognize this record due to accusations of bot-viewers.

On November 9, 2022, Nikolai was detained in Moscow and conseque taken to court, which made the decision to deport him to Moldova, which happened on November 24. It was later uncovered that he was tortured during detention.

After arriving to Moldova, Nekoglai made an investigation-video on YouTube on how he was treated while being detained in Moscow. After this, Nekoglai started to show support towards Ukraine, extremely criticizing Russia’s government. Later, he bought drones for the Ukrainian Army and delivered them himself.

Biography 
Nikolai Lebedev was born in Chișinău, Moldova. When he was 9 years old, his mother died of cancer, and when Nekoglai was 10 years old, his father died of tuberculosis, after which his older brother began to take care of his upbringing.

He began to conduct live broadcasts on the Twitch video streaming service in 2016. He played Dota 2 and Counter Strike: Global Offensive mainly on live broadcasts.

In May 2021, he shot a video in TikTok, which brought him his first fame. Nekoglai made a reaction to the video of Russian singer and rapper Egor Kreed and shouted in it: «Razryvnaya! Yumorish, yumorish!» (Russian: Разрывная! Юморишь, юморишь! lit. Explosive! Humorous, humorous!).

Later he met Ivan Zolochevsky from the Moscow region, who also shot videos in TikTok, under the pseudonym «IvanZolo2004». They began to conduct joint live broadcasts and duets in TikTok, and later began streaming on Twitch.

On December 22, 2021, streamers set a record for the number of simultaneous viewers of the broadcast on Russian-language Twitch – 261 thousand viewers watched the broadcast at the same time, and on January 10, 2022, they broke their own record – there were 578 thousand people at the peak of the broadcast.

On the night of May 6, 2022, Nekoglai had an accident in Moscow, resulting in a concussion. The driver died on the spot.

Persecution 
On November 7, 2022, he posted a video in TikTok with a parody of a Russian soldier throwing Ukrainian grenades, with song Rasputin by the German group Boney-M. This caused a negative reaction from the head of the Safe Internet League , who called Nekoglai a "bantling". On November 9, he was detained and taken to the Babushkinsky court in Moscow, where he was fined five thousand rubles and sentenced to deportation to Moldova, since he is its citizen. On November 10, a video spread on the Internet in which Nikolai, shaved bald and having visible bruises, declares that he "feels like an animal" and apologizes for the recorded video. According to his friends, the blogger was beaten, cigarettes were extinguished on his head.

On November 24, Nekoglai was deported to Moldova on a connecting flight in Armenia.

While in Moldova, on December 4, he released a video titled "Exposing the Ministry of Internal Affairs. The history of the lawlessness of the Russian Federation", in which he spoke about the tortures inflicted on him by employees of the Russian special services. In particular, he was beaten, stripped, raped with a bottle, his hair was torn and his head was sliced by a razor when he was forcibly shaved. He was denied access to his lawyer and was held in a solitary confinement for a week. The belongings he had on him when he was detained, including 200,000 of rubbles and two IPhones, were confiscated without being filed in the detention protocols. Later, one of his phones was geolocated using Apple ID to an appartment block in Moscow.

Discography

Singles 
 Razryvnaya (Rus: Разрывная) (2021)
 Kolyan (Rus: Колян) (2021)
 Obychniy paren'''  (feat. ivanzolo2004, prod. Slava Marlow) (Rus: Обычный парень) (2022)
 Gangster (feat. Daniil Stepanov) (Rus: Гангстер) (2022)
 Cumback (2022)
 LED'' (2022)

On March 3, 2022, Nekoglai released track «Cumback». He got into the ratings of the TopHit website, namely: the fourth place of the chart «The best YouTube clips in Russia for a week», and also took 49th place of the chart «New Russian Spotify hits in Russia for a month».

References 

2000 births
Living people
People from Chișinău
Russian TikTokers
Russian YouTubers
Moldovan people of Russian descent